The 1982 Louisiana Tech Bulldogs football team was an American football team that represented Louisiana Tech University as a member of the Southland Conference during the 1982 NCAA Division I-AA football season. In their third year under head coach Billy Brewer, the team compiled a 10–3 record and finished as Southland Conference champions.

Schedule

References

Louisiana Tech
Southland Conference football champion seasons
Louisiana Tech Bulldogs football seasons
Louisiana Tech Bulldogs football